Bellville is a city in Evans County, Georgia, United States. As of the 2020 census, the city had a population of 127. It is the hometown of film director James Kicklighter .

History
Bellville was laid out in 1890 when the railroad was extended to that point. Bellville incorporated in 1959. Hines Daniel served as the first Mayor.

Geography
Bellville is located in western Evans County at  (32.152828, -81.973366), along U.S. Route 280, which leads east  to Claxton, the county seat, and southwest  to Reidsville. Georgia State Route 292 branches off US 280 and passes through the center of Bellville, leading west  to Collins. Georgia State Route 169 crosses GA 292 in the center of Bellville, running north–south.

Climate

Bellville has a humid subtropical climate according to the Köppen classification. The city has hot and humid summers with average highs of 94 degrees and lows of 70 degrees in July. Winters are mild with average January highs of 61 degrees and lows of 36 degrees. Winter storms are rare, but they can happen on occasion.

Demographics

As of the census of 2010, there were 123 people, 54 households, and 42 families residing in the city. The racial makeup of the city was 93.08% White, 5.38% African American and 1.54% Asian. Hispanic or Latino of any race were 6.92% of the population.

There were 54 households, out of which 20.4% had children under the age of 18 living with them, 63.0% were married couples living together, 9.3% had a female householder with no husband present, and 22.2% were non-families. 22.2% of all households were made up of individuals, and 13.0% had someone living alone who was 65 years of age or older. The average household size was 2.41 and the average family size was 2.79.

In the city, the population was spread out, with 20.8% under the age of 18, 5.4% from 18 to 24, 20.8% from 25 to 44, 30.8% from 45 to 64, and 22.3% who were 65 years of age or older. The median age was 47 years. For every 100 females, there were 100.0 males. For every 100 females age 18 and over, there were 110.2 males.

The median income for a household in the city was $57,708, and the median income for a family was $60,000. Males had a median income of $32,083 versus $28,750 for females. The per capita income for the city was $19,414. There were no families and 5.4% of the population living below the poverty line, including no under eighteens and 35.3% of those over 64.

References

External links
 Bellville historical marker

Cities in Georgia (U.S. state)
Cities in Evans County, Georgia